Semolina is a genus of moth in the family Cosmopterigidae. It contains only one species, Semolina leucotricha, which is found on Rapa Iti.

References

External links
Natural History Museum Lepidoptera genus database

Cosmopterigidae